Antoine "Erneste" Védrenne (17 September 1878 – 13 January 1937) was a French rower who competed in the 1900 Summer Olympics.

He was part of the French boat Rowing Club Castillon, which won the bronze medal in the coxed pair.

References

External links

1878 births
1937 deaths
French male rowers
Olympic rowers of France
Rowers at the 1900 Summer Olympics
Olympic bronze medalists for France
Olympic medalists in rowing
Medalists at the 1900 Summer Olympics
European Rowing Championships medalists
Sportspeople from Gironde